The  is a railway line of Japanese private railway company Kintetsu Railway branching off Minami-Osaka Line at  in southern suburbs of Osaka.

History
The Nagano Line was constructed and opened between 1898 and 1902 as the sole line of  who aimed to connect inland town Kawachinagano to Kashiwara on the Kansai Main Line (then of ). The company renamed itself the Osaka Railway Co. in 1919 (being the second company of that name) and decided and built its own line directly to Osaka, branching from Dōmyōji. The company then opened a line diverting from Furuichi to Nara Prefecture, to complete present Minami Osaka Line. Thus the line to Kawachi-Nagano became a branch line, present Nagano Line.

The line was electrified at 1500 VDC in 1923, and the company merged with Kintetsu in 1944. The Furuichi - Kishi section was duplicated in 1957, and extended to Tondabayashi in 1974.

Operation
Nearly all trains go through up to/down from Ōsaka Abenobashi on Minami-Osaka Line. A few trains return at Tondabayashi.

Service
All trains stop at all stations on the Nagano Line. Most trains are operated as a Semi express.

 (L)
Limited number of operation, in the morning down to Tondabayashi or Kawachi-Nagano, in midnight up to Furuichi or Osaka Abenobashi.
 (SE)
Four trains per hour per direction, all day, all to/from Osaka Abenobashi.
 (Ex)
In the rush hours, to/from Osaka Abenobashi.

Stations
All stations are located in Osaka Prefecture.

Local trains (普通) stop at every station. Therefore, it is omitted here.

References
This article incorporates material from the corresponding article in the Japanese Wikipedia

Nagano Line
Rail transport in Osaka Prefecture
1067 mm gauge railways in Japan